is a joint-use railway station on the Gonō Line and Tsugaru Railway Line in the city of Goshogawara, Aomori, Japan, jointly operated by East Japan Railway Company (JR East) and the private railway operator Tsugaru Railway Company.

Lines
Goshogawara Station is served by the JR East Gonō Line and forms the terminus of the Tsugaru Railway Line.

Station layout
Goshogawara Station has a single side platform and an island platform serving three tracks. The JR Gono Line uses the side platform and half of the island platform, while the Tsugaru Line uses the other half of the island platform. The station building has a staffed Midori no Madoguchi ticket office. The exterior of the JR East station structure was rebuilt in 2013, reopening on 1 August 2013.

JR East

Platforms

Tsugaru Railway

Platforms

History
Goshogawara Station opened on September 25, 1918, as a station on the Japanese National Railways (JNR) Goshogawara Line. On June 1, 1927, the Goshogawara Line was joined with the newly nationalized Mutsu Railway. The Tsugaru Railway Line began operations from Goshogawara on July 15, 1930. On July 10, 1956, the Tsugaru Railway portion of the station was officially renamed , to distinguish it from the JNR portion. With the privatization of JNR on April 1, 1987, the JNR portion came under the operational control of JR East.

Passenger statistics
In fiscal 2016, the JR East station was used by an average of 894 passengers daily (boarding passengers only) The passenger figures for the JR East station in previous years are as shown below.

Surrounding area

 Goshogawara Post office
 Goshogawara City Hall

See also
 List of railway stations in Japan

References

External links

  
 Tsugaru-Goshogawara Station  

Stations of East Japan Railway Company
Railway stations in Aomori Prefecture
Gonō Line
Tsugaru Railway Line
Railway stations in Japan opened in 1918
Goshogawara